Roseospirillum  is a genus of bacteria from the family of Rhodospirillaceae.

References

Further reading 
 

Rhodospirillales
Monotypic bacteria genera
Bacteria genera